Cefpodoxime is an oral, third-generation cephalosporin antibiotic available in the US in various generic preparations. It is active against both Gram-positive and Gram-negative organisms with notable exceptions including Pseudomonas aeruginosa, Enterococcus, and Bacteroides fragilis. It is typically used to treat acute otitis media, pharyngitis, sinusitis, and gonorrhea. It also finds use as oral continuation therapy when intravenous cephalosporins (such as ceftriaxone) are no longer necessary for continued treatment.

Cefpodoxime inhibits peptidoglycan synthesis in bacterial cell walls. It has an oral bioavailability of approximately 50%, which is increased when taken with food.  It has an elimination half-life of 2-3 hours in adults, which is prolonged in renal failure. Approved indications include community acquired pneumonia, uncomplicated skin and skin structure infections, and uncomplicated urinary tract infections.

It was patented in 1980 and approved for medical use in 1989.

Spectrum of bacterial susceptibility and resistance
Cefpodoxime has been used to treat gonorrhoea, tonsillitis, pneumonia, and bronchitis. The following minimum inhibitory concentrations have been reported:

 Haemophilus influenzae: ≤0.03 – 1 μg/ml
 Neisseria gonorrhoeae: 0.004 – 0.06 μg/ml
 Streptococcus pyogenes: ≤0.004 – 2 μg/ml

Brand name
Zoetis markets cefpodoxime proxetil under the trade name  Simplicef for veterinary use, Finecure, India markets the products under trade name Cefpo.

Vantin (by Pfizer) in suspension or tablet form.

Toraxim (by Delta Pharma Ltd. Bangladesh)

Trucef (by Renata Limited, Bangladesh)

Tricef (by Alkaloid Skopje, North Macedonia)

Orelox (by Sanofi-Aventis)

MAPDOX-CV: Cefpodoxime and Clavulanic acid combination

MONOTAX O (Cefpodoxime)/ MONOTAX CV (Cefpodoxime and Clavulanic acid combination) (by Zydus Healthcare Ltd.)

ACXIME 200/CV (by Allencia Biosciences, India)

POSTPOD-50 (Cefpodoxime 50mg/5ml) (by Laafon Galaxy Pharmaceuticals)

References

External links 
  – cefpodoxime proxetil
  Vantin Tablets and Oral Suspension Torpod (Torrent) Full U.S. Prescribing Information (from manufacturer's website)
 Simplicef (from manufacturer's website)
 Intas Pharmaceuticals Ltd. » Animal Health :: Intas - a leading global pharmaceutical formulation development, manufacturing and marketing company

Cephalosporin antibiotics
Thiazoles
Ketoximes